Euzora is a genus of moths in the subfamily Lymantriinae. The genus was described by Turner in 1915.

Species
Euzora collucens (Lucas, 1890)
Euzora costalis Moore, 1879

References

Lymantriinae
Moth genera